Zheng Wei (born June 13, 1981 in Qingdao) is a Chinese football player.

Professional career

Shanghai Shenhua
Zheng Wei started his football career with Shanghai 02 before the club were taken over by Shanghai Shenhua in 2002. Despite being promoted to Shenhua's senior team in 2002, he would have to wait until the 2004 league season before he could make his debut. He would eventually play in 5 league games for Shanghai in the 2004 league season. This however was to prove his most successful season with Shanghai, and despite staying with them for a further two seasons he could only make a further 3 appearances for them.

Shanxi Baorong Chanba
Zheng Wei would have a loan period with Shanghai Zobon for one season before he would move to Shaanxi Baorong Chanba at the beginning of the 2007 league season where he immediately established himself as a versatile left midfielder and defensive midfielder. An immediate regular he would play in 23 league games in his debut season and see Shaanxi fight off relegation. With a fresh start in the 2008 league season, Zheng would spearhead the Shaanxi midfield that would fight for the league title, however despite an encouraging start to the season Shaanxi, finished fifth in the league. With the team unable to improve upon the previous season's results the club brought in Zhu Guanghu and then Milorad Kosanović to manage the team and Zheng saw his playing time reduced. By the end of the 2010 league season Zheng would be allowed to leave the club and he would return to Shanghai Shenhua.

References

External links
Player profile at Shaanxi Baorong Chanba website (Chinese)
Player stats at Sohu.com (Chinese)
Player stats at Sodasoccer.com (Chinese)

1981 births
Living people
Chinese footballers
Footballers from Qingdao
Shanghai Shenhua F.C. players
Pudong Zobon players
Beijing Renhe F.C. players
Chinese Super League players
China League One players
Association football midfielders